The Equinox is the third and final album by heralded Queens hip hop duo Organized Konfusion. It was released in 1997 on Priority Records.

Background
The group branched out to work with a number of outside producers, including Diamond D, Showbiz, Buckwild and Rockwilder. The effort is a concept album about the lives of two Black teens. Included on the album are two ambitious tracks: "Invetro" and "Hate." The former gives voice to the unborn, with Pharoahe Monch and Prince Po rhyming as unborn twins, one hoping for their mother to get an abortion, the other praying for a chance to live, respectively, while the latter features Monch and Po rhyming as white supremacists. "Invetro" follows in the same steps as "Stray Bullet" from the group's previous album, giving voices to things  that can not speak.

Critical reception
AllMusic called The Equinox "an album full of stimulating lyrics and well arranged instrumentation." Spin wrote that "the production is rhythmically and melodically expressive." The Chicago Tribune wrote: "Devoid of pop hooks, the album is a gem of underground economy: crisp drum tracks, thunderous bass lines and simple keyboard, horn or guitar loops."

Track listing

Charts

References

Organized Konfusion albums
1997 albums
Priority Records albums
Albums produced by Rockwilder
Albums produced by Buckwild